The Compaq Evo is a series of business PCs (desktop and laptop) and thin clients made by Compaq and Hewlett-Packard following the 2002 merger. The Evo brand was introduced by Compaq in May 2001 as a business-oriented brand. It replaced the Deskpro brand of desktops and the Armada brand of notebooks.
Evo was rebranded as HP Compaq which was used until 2013. It is not to be confused with the later Intel Evo branding for performant laptops.

Design

The Desktops were small and made to be positioned horizontally instead of vertically so that the monitor could be placed on top to save space. Most featured a sleek silver and black compact design. The early models were shipped with CD-ROM drives but Compaq  shipped Evos with CD-RW drives and DVD-ROM drives. The design of some models were only allowed for one CD or DVD drive, but some models had bigger designs for 2 CD or DVD drives. Some models also shipped with a 3½ floppy drive, positioned below the CD or DVD drive. Most models also had 2 USB 2.0 ports in the front for convenience as well as having two in the back for human interface devices and external volumes. Most also had a headphone and microphone jack in the front with a line in and line out in the back.

The laptops were a conservative design, described by one reviewer as "The old-school black, squared-off-corner business notebook". Most models had a tough black case reminiscent of IBM's ThinkPad, a midsize 14" or 15" screen and good multimedia capability.

Most desktops and some laptops were shipped with Pentium 4 processors and some  Laptops were shipped with Centrino platforms. The thin clients were based on the Geode processor family.

Distribution

The Compaq Evo Desktop computer was a great option for businesses and schools because of its compact and cheap design. It was affordable and had the needed specs for businesses and schools.

All Compaq Evo computers were shipped standard with Windows XP or Windows 2000 running on them.

The last Evo-branded models were released in 2003, later replaced by re-branded (like other Compaq-branded products) as HP Compaq products.

Models

Desktop models
 Compaq Evo D300 series
 Compaq Evo D310 series
 Compaq Evo D311 series
 Compaq Evo D320 series
 Compaq Evo D380 series
 Compaq Evo D381 series
 Compaq Evo D500 series
 Compaq Evo D510 series
 Compaq Evo D520 series
 Compaq Evo W4000 series
 Compaq Evo W6000 series
 Compaq Evo W8000 series

Notebook models

The Presario-based series laptop (N800 and N1000) uses a desktop-based Pentium 4 CPU.

Known near-clone laptop models:
Evo N110 - Armada 110
Evo N400c - Armada M300
 Evo N800 series - Presario 2800
 Evo N1000/N1020 - Presario 1500
Evo N1005 - Presario 900
The final model to carry the Compaq Evo name was the 14.1" N620c notebook. It was an early Pentium-M system which featured up to a 1.6Ghz processor, it offered 256 MB RAM as standard but that amount can be easily upgraded to 512 MB or even 1 GB. The N620c was not Intel Centrino-based but instead used a Compaq wireless module that snapped onto the Multiport slot on the lid of the notebook.

Thin clients
Thin Clients are corporate client devices that allows a user to access a network account located on a server. The vertical orientation enhanced air flow without the need for a fan. Despite its small size, the design provides a distinctive appearance with a high degree of visual impact. They come in two different series.
 Compaq Evo T20 series
 Compaq Evo T30 series

External links
Evo is Intel's new platform for laptop PCs. It's not a new chip, it's a groundbreaking standard for chips, graphics, screens, connectivity, and other features. Evo devices create a smooth, delightful computing experience.
 Evo products at HP support

References 

Evo
Evo
IBM PC compatibles
Computer-related introductions in 2001